Carl Reginald Smith (born April 2, 1945) is an American former professional baseball player. He played in Major League Baseball (MLB) as an outfielder and afterwards served as a coach and front office executive. He also played in the Nippon Professional Baseball (NPB) for two seasons at the end of his playing career. During a seventeen-year MLB career (1966–1982), Smith appeared in 1,987 games, hit 314 home runs with 1,092 RBI and batted .287. He was a switch-hitter who threw right-handed. In his prime, he had one of the strongest throwing arms of any outfielder in the MLB. Smith played at least seventy games in thirteen different seasons, and in every one of those thirteen seasons, his team had a winning record.

Playing career
Smith grew up in Los Angeles, California, and attended Centennial High School in Compton, California. He won the International League batting title in 1966 with a .320 average while playing for the Toronto Maple Leafs. He was called up to the MLB late in that season and played for the Boston Red Sox (1966–73), St. Louis Cardinals (1974–76), Los Angeles Dodgers (1976–81) and San Francisco Giants (1982). He appeared in four World Series, including during his rookie 1967 season for the Red Sox, and three (1977, 1978 and 1981) for the Dodgers. He hit three home runs in the 1977 series.

Smith was traded along with Ken Tatum from the Red Sox to the St. Louis Cardinals for Bernie Carbo and Rick Wise on October 26, 1973. He later called Boston a racist city, and was censured for his comments by Boston mayor Kevin White. On June 15, 1976, Smith was traded to the Los Angeles Dodgers for Bob Detherage, Joe Ferguson, and Freddie Tisdale.

In the 1978 season, Dodger pitcher Don Sutton went public with comments that Smith was a more valuable player to the Dodgers than the more-celebrated Steve Garvey. This led to an infamous clubhouse wrestling match between Sutton and Garvey. Tommy John, who also played with Smith in Los Angeles, thought that Smith was a great leader. "He was a Don Baylor type, an outspoken enforcer, a guy who played his fanny off for us."

In the 1981 season as a member of the Dodgers, Smith was taunted by Giants fan Michael Dooley, who then threw a batting helmet at him. Smith then jumped into the stands at Candlestick Park and started punching him. He was ejected from the game, and Dooley was arrested. Five months later, Smith joined the Giants as a free agent.

After one season in San Francisco, Smith then moved to NPB with the Yomiuri Giants, at a salary of close to a million dollars and the use of three automobiles. Smith was a productive power-hitter for the Giants for two seasons, but often bristled against the codified traditions of the Yomiuri organization in particular and baseball in Japan in general.

Career statistics
In 1,987 games over 17 Major League seasons, Smith posted a .287 batting average (2020-for-7033) with 2,020 hits, 1,123 runs, 363 doubles, 57 triples, 314 home runs, 1,092 RBI, 137 stolen bases, 890 base on balls, 1,030 strikeouts, a .366 on-base percentage, and a .489 slugging percentage. He recorded a career .978 fielding percentage. In four World Series and four playoff series covering 32 games, he hit .234 (25-for-107) with 17 runs, 6 home runs, and 17 RBI.

Coaching career
After his playing career ended, Smith rejoined the Dodgers, where he served as a coach under Tommy Lasorda, a minor league instructor, and a player development official.

Smith became involved with USA Baseball in 1999 as hitting coach on the 1999 Professional Team at the Pan American Games in Winnipeg, Manitoba (Silver, Olympic qualifiers). Smith again served as USA hitting coach in the 2000 Olympic Games in Sydney, Australia where the US Team took home Gold. He also served as hitting coach for the 2007 IBAF Baseball World Cup in Taiwan (Gold). Smith also served as hitting coach for Team USA during the 2006 World Baseball Classic, and served as hitting coach for the Bronze medal winning USA Baseball Olympic team at the 2008 Summer Olympics in Beijing.

Smith runs a baseball academy in Encino, California, where he trains youth players, including Max Fried and Austin Wilson.

Smith helped coach the NL All Stars in 2021 as part of Dave Roberts' staff.

Personal life 
Smith has a pilot's license and can play seven different musical instruments.

See also

 List of Major League Baseball career home run leaders
 List of Major League Baseball career hits leaders
 List of Major League Baseball career runs scored leaders
 List of Major League Baseball career runs batted in leaders
 List of Major League Baseball annual doubles leaders

References

External links

1945 births
Living people
African-American baseball coaches
African-American baseball players
American expatriate baseball players in Canada
American expatriate baseball players in Japan
American League All-Stars
Baseball coaches from California
Baseball coaches from Louisiana
Baseball players from Los Angeles
Baseball players from Shreveport, Louisiana
Boston Red Sox players
Florida Instructional League Red Sox players
Gold Glove Award winners
Los Angeles Dodgers coaches
Los Angeles Dodgers players
Major League Baseball center fielders
Major League Baseball right fielders
National League All-Stars
Pittsfield Red Sox players
Reading Red Sox players
San Francisco Giants players
St. Louis Cardinals players
Sportspeople from Compton, California
Toronto Maple Leafs (International League) players
United States national baseball team people
Waterloo Hawks (baseball) players
Wytheville Twins players
Yomiuri Giants players
21st-century African-American people
20th-century African-American sportspeople